Óscar Pinto may refer to:

 Óscar Pinto (fencer) (born 1962), Portuguese fencer
 Óscar Pinto (footballer) (born 2002), Peruvian footballer